Santavuori is a hill in Ilmajoki municipality, South Ostrobothnia. It rises 145 metres above sea level.

A windfarm with 20 wind turbines is currently being built on Santavuori. Santavuori was given its name in 1597 during the Cudgel War.

References

Landforms of South Ostrobothnia
Hills of Finland